Hot Hot Heat is a Canadian indie rock band from Victoria, British Columbia, formed in 1999. The band was signed by Seattle label Sub Pop in 2001 and released its first EP, Knock Knock Knock, and first full-length album, Make Up the Breakdown, the following year. The band released five full-length albums, the last being the self-titled Hot Hot Heat in 2016. The band's style makes use of electronic and traditional instruments and has variously been categorized as dance-punk, post-punk revival, new wave, and art-punk. They made an appearance on Yo Gabba Gabba!, with the song, "Time to Go Outdoors". It was featured on the "Talent" episode.

After five years of little activity, on March 13, 2016, Hot Hot Heat announced new music in the form of a special 7" titled "Nature of Things" to be released for Record Store Day (April 16, 2016). Following on from this, on April 5, the band announced via Twitter they would be releasing their fifth and final self-titled album on June 24. New song "Kid Who Stays in the Picture" was premiered the same day.

Career
Dustin Hawthorne, a drugstore clerk, and Steve Bays, a personal assistant, had been in many different bands together since 1995 and met Paul Hawley in 1998. In 1999, Hawley bought a Juno 6 keyboard and asked Bays to try playing it, as no one else knew how. Hawley took over the drums from Bays and Hawthorne played bass. Matthew Marnik, who was a friend of the band, sang vocals. The band's original sound can be considered electropunk.

The band soon changed direction to a more melodic, pop-influenced style, losing Marnik and adding guitarist Dante DeCaro. Strongly influenced by the new wave sound of 1980s bands XTC, The Clash, and Elvis Costello and the Attractions, the new lineup, with Steve on vocals, quickly released a series of 7" singles and toured extensively in Canada and the American Pacific Northwest, joining up with similarly styled indie rock bands such as Les Savy Fav, The French Kicks, Radio 4, Ima Robot, and Pretty Girls Make Graves, and opening for established Canadian rockers Sloan on a national tour.

The band's touring exposure attracted the interest of Seattle record label Sub Pop, who signed Hot Hot Heat in 2001, leading to the early 2002 release of EP Knock Knock Knock, produced in part by Chris Walla of Death Cab for Cutie. Although Hot Hot Heat got its start as a hardcore band, by the time it made contact with Sub Pop, its sound had mutated into what would soon be known as dance-punk. The band stood at the forefront of a movement that would explode on the indie rock scene within another year.  That release was followed up quickly by the band's first full-length release, Make Up the Breakdown, produced by Nirvana and Soundgarden producer Jack Endino.

That album quickly found critical acclaim, and its singles "Bandages" and "Talk to Me, Dance With Me" received regular airplay on MTV and radio, including influential Los Angeles, California station KROQ-FM, on whose charts both reached No. 1.

However, their track "Bandages" was removed from radio in the UK, from the playlist at BBC Radio 1, in the light of the war in the Middle East. This was thought to have hindered its position at No. 25 in the UK charts. The track had been on the B list on the station, guaranteeing 15 plays a week and a potential audience of millions. It was removed because of a "prevalence of the word 'bandages' in the song", a spokesperson said. In 2002, the band signed with Warner in the U.S.

In 2003 the band re-released the 2001 album of tracks recorded prior to their Sub Pop recordings, Scenes One Through Thirteen, on the OHEV Records label. Reflecting the band's transition period between their original sound and the present, and thus very much unlike what fans had heard on Knock Knock Knock and Make Up the Breakdown.

In 2004 Make Up the Breakdown won "Favourite Album" at the Canadian Independent Music Awards by popular vote. Guitarist Dante DeCaro announced his departure from the band in October 2004, but stayed to complete their next album, and in 2005 joined Montreal band Wolf Parade. That album, Elevator was the band's major label debut and was released commercially by Warner Bros. In April 2005, Dante handed guitar duties over to replacement Luke Paquin when the band started their 2005 tour.  In June Elevator appeared in the top ten of the !earshot Campus and Community Radio chart.

In 2005, the band opened for Weezer and Foo Fighters on the "Foozer Tour".

Hot Hot Heat played an opening set for American synth rock group The Killers at Red Rocks Amphitheatre on May 17, 2007.  However, The Killers were forced to pull out after three songs because lead singer Brandon Flowers was suffering from bronchitis.

The follow-up to Elevator, Happiness Ltd.,  was released on September 11, 2007.  In late March 2007, the band posted the song "Give Up?" on their MySpace page as a sample of the album, and it was released on iTunes as a single on May 15. A second single entitled "Let Me In" was released on July 16.

Hot Hot Heat toured in 2007 with Snow Patrol as their opening act on the U.S. leg of their summer tour. Their headlining tour of Germany, Canada and U.S. started September 3, 2007.

"Let Me In" debuted on KROQ-FM at number 8. On August 8, 2007, the music video for "Let Me In" premiered on Myspace Music. Also, on September 6, 2007, Hot Hot Heat posted their new album on their MySpace.

The band spent most of 2008/2009 recording and constructing their own studio. Experimenting with 5/4 disco grooves and electro loops, they went into the studio with producer/musician Ryan Dahle from Limblifter/Age of Electric awhile doing a brief Canadian tour opening for Bloc Party. At some point during this period Dustin Hawthorne apparently left the band with little to no explanation as to why since. Parker Bossley (from Fake Shark - Real Zombie!) became their newest bassist, and then later Louis Hearn.

Fourth album Future Breeds was released June 8, 2010 through Dine Alone Records. To build anticipation for the release the band performed residencies at small clubs in NY (Public Assembly in May), and in LA (Bootleg Theater in June).

Hot Hot Heat's public activity was scant in the 2010s; however, they debuted a new song, "Mayor of the City", in May 2013. In response to a fan's question on Twitter, Hot Hot Heat mentioned a release for an album in the fall of 2015. On September 10, 2015 Hot Hot Heat announced new material via their Instagram page for a spring 2016 release. On Friday June 24, 2016 Hot Hot Heat released a 10-track self-titled album and announced it would be their final album.

After the band split, Bays reunited with former bass player Parker Bossley to form Fur Trade.

Members

Final line-up
Paul Hawley – drums (1999–2016)
Steve Bays – keyboards (1999–2016), lead vocals (2000–2016)
Luke Paquin – guitar (2005–2016)
Louis Hearn – bass (2010–2016)

Former
Dustin Hawthorne – bass (1999–2008)
Matthew Marnik –  lead vocals (1999–2000)
Dante DeCaro – guitar (2001–2005)
Parker Bossley – bass (2008–2010)

Timeline

Discography

Studio albums

Compilations
Scenes One Through Thirteen (2002)

EPs
Hot Hot Heat four song 7" (1999)
Hot Hot Heat Split the Red Light Sting (2000)
Hot Hot Heat three song 7" (2001)
Knock Knock Knock (2002)
Happiness Ltd. EP (2007)

Singles

See also

Music of Vancouver
Canadian rock
List of Canadian musicians
List of bands from Canada
List of bands from British Columbia
:Category:Canadian musical groups

References

External links

Hot Hot Heat on PureVolume
Hot Hot Heat Photography
Live pictures of HHH in Edmonton
Hot Hot Heat at New Music Canada
"Fanning the Fame: Hot Hot Heat Sets the World on Fire" CBC Radio 3 session
Hot Hot Heat fansite

Musical groups established in 1999
Musical groups disestablished in 2016
Canadian alternative rock groups
Canadian indie rock groups
Canadian indie pop groups
Canadian new wave musical groups
Musical groups from Victoria, British Columbia
Sub Pop artists
Dance-punk musical groups
Dine Alone Records artists
1999 establishments in British Columbia
2016 disestablishments in British Columbia
Dangerbird Records artists
Sire Records artists
Warner Records artists
Record Collection artists